Itūau County is a county in the Eastern District in American Samoa. The official name is Itūau ma Nofo, however, it is commonly known as just Itūau. It is divided into northern and southern parts by the highest part of the Tutuila's central mountain range. It is peculiar in that it had no county chief. In Nu'uuli in the south, power was divided between village high chief Savusa and the Four Chiefly Houses of the Soliai, Tago, Levu, and Alega. In Fagasā in the north, leadership was shared by the Tupuola and the Alo. The physical division of the county by mountains combined with the lack of a high chief made the county a battleground (itu'au) in ancient times.

It is a small county which only consisted of two villages: Nu'uuli and Fagasā. These villages lie across from each other, Nu'uuli on the south shoreline of Tutuila Island and Fagasā on the north side. They are connected by an inland road which runs west of Pago Pago Bay across the mountain ridge.

Demographics

Itu'au County was first recorded beginning with the 1912 special census. Regular decennial censuses were taken beginning in 1920.

Villages
The county is officially known as Itu'au ma Nofoa (Itu'au and Nofoa), where Itu'au includes Nu'uuli, Faganeanea, and Matu'u. Nofoa is made up of Fagasā, Fagatele, and Fagale'a.

Fagasā
Nu'uuli
Matu'u
Faganeanea

References 

 

Populated places in American Samoa